In enzymology, a tetrahydroxynaphthalene reductase is an enzyme that catalyzes the chemical reaction

scytalone + NADP+  1,3,6,8-tetrahydroxynaphthalene + NADPH + H+

Thus, the two substrates of this enzyme are scytalone and NADP+, whereas its 3 products are 1,3,6,8-tetrahydroxynaphthalene, NADPH, and H+.

This enzyme belongs to the family of oxidoreductases, specifically those acting on the CH-OH group of donor with NAD+ or NADP+ as acceptor. The systematic name of this enzyme class is scytalone:NADP+ Delta5-oxidoreductase.

Structural studies

References

 
 
 

EC 1.1.1
NADPH-dependent enzymes
Enzymes of known structure